Šelpice is a village and municipality of Trnava District in the Trnava region of Slovakia.

References

External links

http://www.statistics.sk/mosmis/eng/run.html
http://en.e-obce.sk/obec/selpice/selpice.html
https://www.selpice.eu/

Villages and municipalities in Trnava District